Mitochondrial outer membrane permeabilization (MOMP), also known as the mitochondrial outer membrane permeability, is one of two ways apoptosis (programmed cell death) can be activated. It is part of the intrinsic pathway of apoptosis, also known as the mitochondrial pathway. MOMP is known as the point of no return in apoptosis. Once triggered, it results in the diffusion of proteins from the space between the inner and outer mitochondrial membranes into the cytosol.

Mechanism
Initiation of MOMP involves Bcl-2 family proteins, including BAX and BAK. The outer mitochondrial membrane, typically permeable to molecules smaller than 5 kDa, forms pores during MOMP that allow it to accommodate proteins larger than 100 kDa. During MOMP, it takes about five minutes for all mitochondrial membranes within a cell to permeabilize.

Outcome
MOMP has been referred to as the point of no return for apoptosis, almost always resulting in the completion of the process, and thus, cell death. However, in limited circumstances, apoptosis does not complete. Sometimes, MOMP does not complete, known as incomplete MOMP (iMOMP) or minority MOMP (miniMOMP). For incomplete MOMP, mitochondrial membranes become permeable in most, but not all, the cell's mitochondria. In minority MOMP, only a few mitochondria of the cell experience MOMP—the result of sublethal stress.

References

Apoptosis
Mitochondria